Alex Moore (born 19 August 1963) is a former Scotland international rugby union player. He won five caps playing on the wing.

Rugby Union career

Amateur career

Moore was born in Ipswich, Queensland, Australia. He played at Livingston RFC for three seasons, followed by three seasons at Gala RFC. He played sevens too, helping Gala to lift the Jedforest trophy in 1985. 

After this he joined Edinburgh Academicals.

Provincial career

While with Gala, he played for South of Scotland District.

On moving to Edinburgh Academicals he then played for Edinburgh District.

International career

Moore played for the Scotland 'B' side in 1986 and 1989. He was called up at short notice to the 1990 Scotland rugby union tour of New Zealand and performed well in early matches. His first international cap was against New Zealand at Auckland on 23 June 1990. The last of his five caps was against England at Twickenham on 16 February 1991.

He played three matches for Barbarians FC.

References

1963 births
Living people
Barbarian F.C. players
Gala RFC players
Livingston RFC players
Rugby union players from Ipswich, Queensland
Scotland international rugby union players
Scottish rugby union players
Rugby union wings
Scotland 'B' international rugby union players
South of Scotland District (rugby union) players
Edinburgh District (rugby union) players